Bucculatrix latviaella is a moth in the family Bucculatricidae. It was described by Ivars Šulcs in 1990. It is found in Fennoscandia, Estonia and Latvia.

The larvae feed on Erigeron acer and possibly Achillea millefolium and/or Leucanthemum vulgare. They mine the leaves of their host plant.

References

Natural History Museum Lepidoptera generic names catalog

Bucculatricidae
Moths described in 1990
Moths of Europe
Leaf miners